Tarun or Tharun is a word from Sanskrit. It is a male given name, meaning "young male". Notable people with the given name Tarun include:

 Tarun (Telugu actor) (born 1981), Indian actor in Telugu and Tamil cinema
 Tarun Arora, Indian actor in Hindi cinema
 Tarun Bhattacharya, Indian musician
 Tarun Bose (born 1928), Indian actor in Hindi cinema
 Tarun Chandra or Tarun, Indian actor in Kannada cinema
 Tarun Dey, Indian footballer
 Tarun Gogoi (born 1936), Indian politician
 Tarun Gopi, Indian film director in Tamil cinema
 Tarun Khanna (born 1968), Indian-born American author and economic strategist
 Tarun Khiwal (born 1967), Indian fashion photographer
 Tarun Majumdar or Tarun Mazumdar (born 1931), Indian film director in Bengali cinema
 Tarun Mandal (born 1959), Indian politician
 Tarun Mansukhani, Indian film director in Hindi cinema
 Tarun Nethula (born 1983), Indian-born New Zealand cricketer
 Tarun Ram Phukan (1877–1939), Indian politician
 Tarun Shatriya, Indian actor in Tamil cinema
 Tarun Tahiliani, Indian fashion designer
 Tarun Tejpal (born 1963), Indian journalist, publisher and a novelist
 Tarun Vijay (born 1951), Indian author, social worker and politician

See also 
 Taroon (disambiguation)

References 

Indian masculine given names